Ekatappa is a town and Village Development Committee in Ilam District in the Province No. 1 of eastern Nepal. At the time of the 1991 Nepal census it had a population of 4,320 persons living in 784 individual households.

Education
Ektappa VDC is supported by proper education facilities. Ektappa Multiple Campus is only one campus in the VDC which is providing bachelor level education. Singa Devi Higher Secondary School is government school which is providing quality of education in Ektappa VDC. Janaki Secondary School & Janakalyan Secondary School are other government schools which are providing secondary level education. There is a private school named Banasthali English Boarding School which is providing lower secondary level education in English medium environment.

Transportation
Transportation facility in this VDC is in developing stage. Daily Jeep services are available from Ilam Municipality and Birtamode. A new road is being constructed joining Ektappa and Damak of Jhapa district which will be much more helpful for people living in Ektappa VDC and its neighbouring VDCs.

Communication and entertainment
There is good facility of communication and entertainment in Ektappa VDC. Ncell's 3G service is available which supports in development Internet service. Similarly Nepal Telecom is another company which is providing network service in Ektappa. National radio station Radio Nepal and other FM stations Kanchanjungha FM (92.6 MHz), Ilam FM (93 MHz), Bani FM (94.9 MHz), Chiyabari FM (88.2 MHz) can clearly be heard in the VDC. Dish Home is the only television service provider in the VDC.

References

External links
UN map of the municipalities of Ilam District

Populated places in Ilam District